Howard Douglas McCurdy  (December 10, 1932 – February 20, 2018) was a Canadian civil rights activist, politician and university professor.

Life and career
Born in London, Ontario, McCurdy's great-great grandfather Nasa McCurdy was an agent on the Underground Railroad by which  African-American slaves escaped to Canada in the 19th century.

He moved to Amherstburg, Ontario, when he was 9 and encountered racism for the first time when he tried to join the Cub Scouts and was excluded, being told to form a Black-only troop. He later traced his activism back to his experiences with discrimination at this young age.

McCurdy studied at the University of Western Ontario, where he received a Bachelor of Arts, and later at Assumption University, where he received a Bachelor of Science. He was awarded a Master of Science and a Ph.D. in microbiology and chemistry from Michigan State University. McCurdy has also served for a time as Michigan State University's president of the National Association for the Advancement of Colored People (NAACP), which he founded.

In 1959, he joined the Biology Department at Assumption College (later the University of Windsor) and, after initially being hired as a lecturer, he eventually became the first person of African descent to hold a tenure track position in a Canadian university. He was Department Head from 1974 to 1979. In 1976–80 he founded and was President of the Canadian College of Microbiologists. McCurdy authored more than 50 scientific papers and served on the editorial boards of Bacteriological Reviews and the Canadian Journal of Microbiology. In 1967–68 he was president of the Canadian Association of University Teachers.

In 1962 he founded the Guardian Club a civil rights organization to fight racial discrimination in Windsor. In 1969 he was the co-founder and the first President of the National Black Coalition of Canada.

McCurdy's speech at the NDP's founding convention is credited with choosing the name New Democratic Party. In 1979, he was elected alderman in the city of Windsor and served two terms until he was elected as the New Democratic MP for the riding of Windsor Walkerville in the federal election of 1984, to become Canada's second Black MP after Lincoln Alexander, and the first Black NDP MP. In the 1988 election he was reelected in the renamed riding of Windsor— St. Clair, where he served until his defeat in the 1993 federal election. He was also a candidate for the party leadership in the 1989 leadership convention which selected Audrey McLaughlin.

McCurdy campaigned for the Ontario New Democratic Party nomination in Windsor—Sandwich in the build-up to the 1995 provincial election, but was unexpectedly defeated by Arlene Rousseau. McCurdy had been endorsed by Premier Bob Rae, while Rousseau was an ally of party dissidents such as Peter Kormos.

In 2003, McCurdy supported Bill Blaikie's campaign for NDP leader.

He served as the president of the Windsor Black Coalition from 2003-2005.

McCurdy died on February 20, 2018, at the age of 85. He was survived by his wife, four children, and 10 grandchildren.

Awards
McCurdy has received many awards, including the Canadian Centennial Medal in 1967, the Queen's Silver Jubilee Medal in 1977, and in 2001 the J. S. Woodsworth Award for Human Rights.

In 2012, McCurdy was made a member of the Order of Ontario.

In November 2012, McCurdy was designated a Member of the Order of Canada.

References

External links

1932 births
2018 deaths
Black Canadian politicians
Canadian biochemists
Members of the House of Commons of Canada from Ontario
Members of the Order of Ontario
Michigan State University alumni
New Democratic Party MPs
Politicians from London, Ontario
Academic staff of University of Windsor
University of Windsor alumni
University of Western Ontario alumni
Windsor, Ontario city councillors
Black Canadian scientists